Yoshiki Takahara (born 17 January 1998) is a Japanese snowboarder who competed at the 2022 Winter Olympics.

Career
Takahara represented Japan at the 2016 Winter Youth Olympics in the snowboard cross and finished in fifth place, winning the small final.

He represented Japan at the 2022 Winter Olympics in the snowboard cross event.

References

1998 births
Living people
Japanese male snowboarders
Snowboarders at the 2016 Winter Youth Olympics
Competitors at the 2019 Winter Universiade
Universiade bronze medalists for Japan
Universiade medalists in snowboarding
Olympic snowboarders of Japan
Snowboarders at the 2022 Winter Olympics
21st-century Japanese people